Mad Hatter is the second and final album from the British hard rock band Bonham, released in 1992.

The album was named after a small bar near San Antonio in Ibiza that the band used to frequent while recording in a nearby disused nightclub called Heartbreak Hotel.

Track listing
"Bing" – 4:48
"Mad Hatter" – 5:20
"Change of a Season" – 6:58
"Hold On" – 4:20
"The Storm" – 5:56
"Ride on a Dream" – 5:47
"Good with the Bad" – 6:36
"Backdoor" – 3:34
"Secrets" – 4:36
"Los Locos" – 3:53
"Chimera" – 5:54

Charts

Singles

Credits
Daniel MacMaster – lead vocals
Ian Hatton – guitars
John Smithson – bass, backing vocals, keyboards, violin
Jason Bonham – drums, percussion

References

1992 albums
Bonham (band) albums
Albums produced by Tony Platt